Gebhard (died 879) was a mid-9th-century count in the Lahngau and the first documented ancestor of the dynasty later known as the Conradines. He was a "leading man of the [East] Franks" and a brother-in-law of Ernest, margrave of the Bavarian Nordgau. Gebhard may be a son of Odo I, Count of Orléans, if identical with Udo the Elder, count in the Lahngau from 821 to 826.

In 838, he allied with Poppo of Grapfeld and Otgar, Archbishop of Mainz, against the rebellious Louis the German and in favour of the emperor Louis the Pious.

He was the father of
Udo, count in the Lahngau
Waldo, abbot of St. Maximin's at Trier
Bertulf, Bishop of Trier
Berengar, count in the Hessengau
who all rose to prominent positions in West Francia.

Sources
The Annals of Fulda. (Manchester Medieval series, Ninth-Century Histories, Volume II.) Reuter, Timothy (trans.) Manchester: Manchester University Press, 1992.

Counts of Germany
Conradines
879 deaths
Year of birth unknown